The 1999 Kroger St. Jude International was a men's tennis tournament played on indoor hard courts in Memphis, United States, that was part of the Championship Series of the 1999 ATP Tour. It was the twenty-ninth edition of the tournament and was held from 15 February through 21 February. Third-seeded Tommy Haas won the singles title.

Finals

Singles

 Tommy Haas defeated  Jim Courier, 6–4, 6–1
 It was Haas' first singles title of his career.

Doubles

 Todd Woodbridge /  Mark Woodforde defeated  Sébastien Lareau /  Alex O'Brien, 6–3, 6–4

References

External links
 ITF tournament edition details

Kroger St. Jude International
U.S. National Indoor Championships
Kroger St. Jude International
Kroger St. Jude International
Kroger St. Jude International